The Birmingham and District Football League (formerly the Birmingham & District Amateur Football Association and often referred to as the Birmingham AFA) is an amateur association football competition covering the city of Birmingham, England, and the surrounding area, for football teams playing on a Saturday.

The association is not part of the English football league system, however the league is affiliated to the Birmingham County Football Association.  The league is composed of eight divisions, containing around 100 teams.

Cup competitions

The Birmingham Football League currently hosts nine cup competitions which consist of the following:

Bill Hill Cup
Holder Cup
Intermediate Cup
Jeffs Cup 
Junior Cup  
Minor Cup   
Senior Cup 
Veterans Cup   
Youth Cup

History

The Association was formed in 1908 with friendly games and a knock-out competition (Chatrian Cup). It was not until 1922 that a league competition was introduced, originally with three Senior Divisions and two Junior Divisions. This has grown to the current Premier Division and a further 8 lower Divisions. While there is promotion and relegation between Divisions One to Seven, the four teams that finish at the bottom of the Premier Division instead have to apply for re-election, and any team from a lower division can in theory apply to replace them as long as they meet facilities criteria.  After 108 years as the Birmingham AFA a vote was taken by the Association's members for the 2015-16 season to end the Association status and change the name of the organisation to the Birmingham & District Football League.

Past presidents
Below is a list of past presidents of the Birmingham & District AFA:

Victor Jones  1908 – 1930
L.T. Roberts  1930 – 1932
J. Drinkwater 1932 – 1934
Sir Edmund Crane  1934 – 1939
F.J. Wicmam 1939 - 1946
Sir Edmund Crane  1946 – 1947
D. Mansell  1947 – 1949 
J. Waldron  1949 – 1951
W.F. Jones 1951 – 1953 
H.S. Smith 1953 – 1955 
N.E. Brookes  1955 – 1957 
J.P. Weaver  1957 – 1959 
H.R. Holder  1959 – 1960 
N.A. Jeffs  1960 – 1962 
F.G.N. Moreton  1962 – 1965 
C.F. Ewins (M.B.E)  1965 – 1968 
H.S. Smith 1968 – 1969
E.L. Hitchman  1969 – 1972
C.H. Patten  1972 – 1975
E.R. Webb  1975 – 1977
H.H. Jones  1977 – 1980
F.H. Reynolds  1980 – 1983
W.G. Hill  1983 – 1986
S.W. Sims  1986 – 1989
P. Witcomb  1989 – 1992
N.L. Worskett  1992 – 1995
G.G. Wilson  1995 – 1998
C.J. Biddle  1998 – 2001
D.J. Winzor  2001 – 2004
S. Hill  2004 – 2007
S. Durham  2007 – 2010
R. Bowl 2010 – 2013 
R. Windsor 2013 – Present

Member clubs 2015–16

Former champions

1922–23 – Wolverhampton Amateurs 
1923–24 – Walsall Phoenix
1924–25 – Wolverhampton Amateurs 
1925–26 – Headlingley
1926–27 – Wolverhampton Amateurs 
1927–28 – Wolverhampton Amateurs 
1928–29 – Old Wulfrunians 
1929–30 – Wolverhampton Amateurs 
1930–31 – Birmingham Gas Officials
1931–32 – Erdington House
1932–33 – Erdington House
1933–34 – Erdington House
1934–35 – Walsall Jolly
1935–36 – Moor Green
1936–37 – Boldmere St Michaels
1937–38 – Walsall Jolly
1938–39 – Walsall Jolly
1939–47 – Not held during the Second World War
1947–48 – Holly Lodge Old Boys
1948–49 – Hay Green
1949–50 – Walsall Phoenix
1950–51 – Staffordshire Casuals 
1951–52 – Staffordshire Casuals 
1952–53 – Staffordshire Casuals 
1953–54 – Old Wulfrunians
1954–55 – Walsall Phoenix
1955–56 – Cresconians
1956–57 – Cresconians
1957–58 – Aston Villa Amateurs
1958–59 – Aston Villa Amateurs
1959–60 – Aston Villa Amateurs
1960–61 – Silhill
1961–62 – Cresconians
1962–63 – Handsworth GSOB
1963–64 – Dudley Old Boys
1964–65 – Dudley Old Boys
1965–66 – Dudley Old Boys
1966–67 – Penncroft
1967–68 – Penncroft
1968–69 – Penncroft
1969–70 – Penncroft
1970–71 – Cradley Chain & Castings
1971–72 – Walsall Phoenix
1972–73 – Silhill
1973–74 – Cradley Chain & Castings
1974–75 – Hall End Amateurs
1975–76 – Old Throstles
1976–77 – Cresconians
1977–78 – Cresconians
1978–79 – Old Dudleians
1979–80 – Old Wulfrunians
1980–81 – Old Throstles
1981–82 – Wolverhampton Casuals 
1982–83 – Sutton United
1983–84 – Sutton United
1984–85 – Sutton United
1985–86 – Staffordshire Casuals 
1986–87 – Colinthians
1987–88 – Wake Green Amateurs
1988–89 – Wake Green Amateurs
1989–90 – Wake Green Amateurs
1990–91 – Wake Green Amateurs
1991–92 – Old Wulfrunians
1992–93 – Dunlop Sports
1993–94 – Wake Green Amateurs
1994–95 – Dunlop Sports
1995–96 – Wake Green Amateurs
1996–97 – Causeway United
1997–98 – Causeway United
1998–99 – Smethwick Hall Old Boys
1999-00 – Village
2000–01 – Old Wulfrunians
2001–02 – New Fullbrook
2002–03 – Old Wulfrunians
2003–04 – Old Wulfrunians
2004–05 – Old Wulfrunians
2005–06 – Lakin Rangers
2006–07 – Sutton United
2007–08 – Village
2008–09 – Shirley Athletic
2009–10 – Sutton United
2010–11 – Sutton United
2011–12 – Sutton United
2012–13 – Village
2013–14 – Old Wulfrunians
2014–15 – Old Wulfrunians

Notes
A.  Wolverhampton Amateurs became Staffordshire Amateurs in 1946. In 1981–82 the club's first team joined the West Midlands (Regional) League as Wolverhampton Casuals but three teams continued playing in the Birmingham AFA as both Wolverhampton Casuals and Staffordshire Casuals.
B.  A different Old Wulfrunians (1908–39) from the current Old Wulfrunians (1926– ) playing in the Birmingham AFA.

References

External links
Official website

 
Sport in Birmingham, West Midlands
Football leagues in England